Ramiro Martín Marino Carlomagno (born 16 November 1988 in Buenos Aires) is an Argentine professional BMX cyclist. He represented his nation Argentina, as a 19-year-old junior, at the 2008 Summer Olympics, and later claimed the bronze medal in the men's elite category at the 2009 UCI BMX World Championships in Adelaide, Australia, finishing behind the American duo and Olympic medalists Mike Day and Donny Robinson.

Marino qualified for the Argentine squad in men's BMX cycling at the 2008 Summer Olympics in Beijing by receiving one of the nation's two available berths based on his top-ten performance from the UCI BMX World Rankings. After he grabbed a twenty-first seed on the morning prelims with a time of 36.768, Marino scored a total of 20 placing points to take the eighth spot in his quarterfinal heat, thus eliminating him from the tournament.

References

External links
 
 
 
 
 

1988 births
Living people
BMX riders
Argentine male cyclists
Olympic cyclists of Argentina
Cyclists at the 2008 Summer Olympics
Pan American Games competitors for Argentina
Cyclists at the 2007 Pan American Games
Argentine sportspeople in doping cases
Doping cases in cycling
Cyclists from Buenos Aires